Rev. James Robinson (1753–1868) was born on the Eastern Shore of Maryland into bondage on March 21, 1753. His master was Francis De Shields. Robinson served under the General Gilbert du Motier, Marquis de Lafayette, and would become a significant African American soldier in the Revolutionary War.

Revolutionary War service
Robinson's master Francis De Shields had him enlist at age 24 and fight in a Virginia Light Infantry Regiment with the promise that he could earn his freedom. His regiment was one of several African American regiments under the command of the General Gilbert du Motier, Marquis de Lafayette.  He fought in the Battle of Brandywine which was a British victory. Also White Haven, Roanoke River, Ragged Point, on Dorset County River, Vienna Ferry, and Cambridge. He led the charge up a British rampart of a redoubt at the Siege of Yorktown and he attacked and defeated three British soldiers at once. General Gilbert du Motier, Marquis de Lafayette, was so impressed with his actions that he personally awarded Robinson a Gold Medal of Valor. This would make him the highest decorated African American veteran of the Revolutionary War. He was one of between 5,000 and 10,000 African Americans who served in the Revolutionary War on the American side.

War of 1812 service

After the Revolutionary War, De Shields reneged on his promise to free Robinson and sold him in New Orleans back into slavery in Louisiana. His new master Calvin Smith, who according to Robinson, was cruel and unforgiving and had him serve in the War of 1812. In 1813 General Andrew Jackson arrived to gather forces to repel the British during what would become the Battle of New Orleans. During an engagement one of Robinson's fingers were shot off in battle. Also at some point he was struck by a saber in the head, leaving a scar he would carry his whole life. After the American victory, soldiers gathered around General Andrew Jackson and he announced that the slaves who had fought would not be freed after all. Robinson thought about taking his gun and shooting General Andrew Jackson right then and there but decided against it.

Life after being freed
Eventually Robinson obtained his freedom in the 1830s and became an ordained minister. In the 1840 and 1850 U.S. Census he was living in Butler County, Ohio with his wife Curtilda. They had two sons, Alexander and Wesley Sr. Wesley would go on to serve in the American Civil War in the 102nd United States Colored Infantry Regiment. In the 1860 U.S. Census Robinson and his family were living in Detroit. Robinson wrote a book James Roberts (slave narrative) about his life under a variation of his name. At the time of Robinson's death he lived at 137 E. Fort St. Robinson's family lived at 136 W. Lafayette Blvd in Detroit, which is now a private park called Lafayette Greens. In 1825 Robinson once again met Lafayette during his return tour of the United States. Robinson died in Detroit on March 27, 1868, at the age of 115. During his funeral large crowds gathered to watch. He was the last living African American Veteran of the Revolutionary War at the time and the oldest person buried in Elmwood Cemetery. His last known living descendant was Gertrude Robinson, his granddaughter, who died in Ohio in 1983.

Military honors at last

On June 22, 2019, a joint grave marking ceremony was held at Elmwood Cemetery by the Michigan societies of the Sons of the American Revolution and General Society of the War of 1812. Military honors with assistance from the American Legion were conducted 151 years after his death. Many dignitaries spoke including U.S. Representative Rashida Tlaib and Maj. Gen. Leonard Isabelle of the Michigan Air National Guard and Sen. Gary Peters provided a letter which was read. Tlaib had read Robinson's achievements into the U.S. Congressional Record and presented a certificate which was sent to the National Mall Liberty Fund D.C. The National Mall Liberty Fund D.C. is working to build the National Liberty Memorial, which will memorialize the African American contribution to Independence.

References 

1753 births
1868 deaths
African-American United States Army personnel
18th-century American slaves
Black Patriots
Continental Army soldiers
African-American Christians
Gilbert du Motier, Marquis de Lafayette
Free Negroes
People from Detroit
People from Maryland in the War of 1812
People from Louisiana
Longevity claims
Burials at Elmwood Cemetery (Detroit)